BNY Mellon Center is a 54-story office skyscraper located in Philadelphia, Pennsylvania. The height to its structural top is 792 ft (241 m). Construction was completed in 1990. The building was formerly called Mellon Bank Center until 2009, when it was renamed as part of a branding initiative for the newly formed Bank of New York Mellon. In early 2019, the building was sold for $451.6 million to Silverstein Properties, a record for a Philadelphia property.

Background
The building was designed by the architectural firm of Kohn Pedersen Fox and is owned by HRPT Properties Trust. The building stands on the former site of the city's Greyhound bus terminal. The address of the building is 1735 Market Street (between Market Street and John F. Kennedy Boulevard, just east of 18th Street.

BNY Mellon Center is part of a complex of office buildings known as Penn Center and as such is alternately known as Nine Penn Center. A shopping concourse underneath the building connects to an adjacent winter garden and Suburban Station. BNY Mellon Center is currently the 161st tallest building in the world and the fifth tallest building in Philadelphia.

A private club called the Pyramid Club occupies the 52nd floor of the building.

Tenants
Tenants have included the headquarters of Sunoco and FMC Corporation. It also houses offices of Citizens Bank, Aberdeen Asset Management, Aon Corporation, The Boston Consulting Group, UBS, CrowdConnect Group, the PFM Group, Goldman Sachs, e-commerce company iDealster, and the law firm Ballard Spahr.

In popular culture
The lobby of this building made an appearance in the 1993 film Philadelphia, starring Tom Hanks and Denzel Washington.

See also

List of skyscrapers
List of tallest buildings in Philadelphia
List of tallest buildings in the world
List of tallest buildings in the United States
List of masts
List of towers
BNY Mellon Center (Pittsburgh)

References

External links

Emporis

Kohn Pedersen Fox buildings
Skyscraper office buildings in Philadelphia
Bank company headquarters in the United States
Penn Center, Philadelphia
Office buildings completed in 1990
1990 establishments in Pennsylvania